Logan Park Cemetery is a cemetery located at the northwest edge of Sioux City, Iowa.  The cemetery contains a number of notable figures from the history of Sioux City.

Notable people buried in Logan Park Cemetery
Jay Darling, cartoonist.
David W. Stewart, U.S. Senator in 1926 and 1927

External links
Logan Park Cemetery burial records at Findagrave.
Logan Park Cemetery tour

Cemeteries in Iowa
Sioux City, Iowa
Protected areas of Woodbury County, Iowa
Tourist attractions in Sioux City, Iowa